Chris Meidt (born June 1, 1969) is an American football coach and former player. He served as the head football coach at  St. Olaf College, an NCAA Division III school in Northfield, Minnesota, for six seasons, from 2002 to 2007, compiling a record of 40–20. Meidt was an offensive assistant coach for the Washington Redskins in 2008 and 2009 under Jim Zorn.

Chris Meidt still holds the minnesota high school record for most passing yards in his high school career with 8533 yards from 1984-1987.

Head coaching record

References

1969 births
Living people
American football quarterbacks
Bethel Royals football coaches
Bethel Royals football players
St. Olaf Oles football coaches
Washington Redskins coaches
High school football coaches in Minnesota
People from Lyon County, Minnesota
Players of American football from Minnesota